Yegor Troyakov (born 24 February 1995) is a Belarusian professional footballer who plays for Gomel.

References

External links
 
 
 Profile at FC Gomel website

1995 births
Living people
Belarusian footballers
Association football defenders
FC Gomel players
FC Sputnik Rechitsa players
FC Smorgon players
FC Volna Pinsk players
FC Belshina Bobruisk players